The Four-man competition at the IBSF World Championships 2023 was held on 4 and 5 February 2023.

Results
The first two runs were started on 4 February at 13:04 and the last two runs on 5 February at 13:00.

References

Four-man